Bugallon, officially the Municipality of Bugallon, is a 2nd class municipality in the province of Pangasinan, Philippines. According to the 2020 census, it has a population of 74,962 people.

History

The Municipality of Bugallon was formerly called "Salasa" (meaning floor joist in the dialect, a part of a wooden house where the floor is attached to). In the Spanish colonial era, the Spanish authorities established the town center in Poblacion (now Barangay Salasa). Because of the 1914 massive flooding and erosion, the town center was later transferred to Barrio Anagao (became Barangay Poblacion) but the Our Lady of Lourdes Catholic Church, one of the oldest churches in the country, could not be transferred (every time someone attempts, he dies). A new Catholic church was created in the Poblacion, the Saint Andrew Catholic Church. This is the reason why Bugallon has two Catholic Churches (one in Salasa and the other in Anagao).

Fr. Antonio Perez. founded Salasa (1714-1747)  In 1720, Poblacion was in Barangay Polong's Don Francisco Valencerina yard, later transferred later to Baranggay Salasa on January 24, 1734, by Fr. Fernando Garcia. The Plaza, Presedencia, the church and convent, were engineered by the Frayle (surrounded by parallel calles). Doña Milagros Klar, wife of then manager of Pantranco (Philtranco) donated in 1935, the Our Lady of Lourdes statue to Salasa Shrine.

The town was named after the town's hero Major Jose Torres Bugallon who fought together with Gen. Antonio Luna during the Philippine–American War in 1899. February 5, 1899, at the Battle of La Loma, Bugallon faced Gen. Arthur MacArthur. Bugallon suffered a shot to the thigh during the battle. Later that day, in the arms of Antonio Luna, Bugallon died from excessive loss of blood.

In 1921, the town of Salasa was renamed to Bugallon. Mr. Canullas founded the Jose Torres Bugallonas association and a monument was erected in the plaza, wherein the bones of General Bugallon were interred thereat on January 12, 1958.

The act of changing Salasa an old town to a new one, Bugallon, required a congressional approval sponsored by the Congressman Mauro Navarro, first district of Pangasinan, and obtained congressional approval in changing Salasa to Bugallon. Hence, Salasa became a mere barangay but remains the seat of Our Lady of Lourdes Parish (11 barangays) and the other is Bugallon's St. Andrew the Apostle (14 barangay).

Geography

Barangays
Bugallon is politically subdivided into 24 barangays. These barangays are headed by elected officials: Barangay Captain, Barangay Council, whose members are called Barangay Councilors. All are elected every three years.

 Angarian
 Asinan
 Bañaga
 Bacabac
 Bolaoen
 Buenlag
 Cabayaoasan
 Cayanga
 Gueset
 Hacienda
 Laguit Centro
 Laguit Padilla
 Magtaking
 Pangascasan
 Pantal
 Poblacion
 Polong
 Portic
 Salasa
 Salomague Norte
 Salomague Sur
 Samat
 San Francisco
 Umanday

Climate

Demographics

Economy

Government
Bugallon, belonging to the second congressional district of the province of Pangasinan, is governed by a mayor designated as its local chief executive and by a municipal council as its legislative body in accordance with the Local Government Code. The mayor, vice mayor, and the councilors are elected directly by the people through an election which is being held every three years.

Elected officials

Tourism

Bugallon's interesting points, destinations and products, events, include:

Freedom Park, Town Hall, Church of Christ Philippine Theological College, Sangguniang Bayan Hall, Mt. Zion Pilgrim Mountain and Retreat House, United Methodist Church, National Building and Library, Senior Juan Farm Resort, Municipal Auditorium, Gymmasium and Coop Canteen, Concrete Water Tank in Laguit Padilla, Laguit Padilla Falls, Iglesia Ni Kristo, Hanging Bridge, Bubunga Dam, Gabion Type Dike, Lema Canal, Bugallon Supermarket, Community Hospital,Eco-Tourism Park, High Value Crop Organic Farm, Major Jose Torres Bugallon Park and Agricultural, Carabao Landmark.
Le Dilla Duhat Wine is a Fruit Wine of Duhat Wine Enterprises, Laguit Padilla Multi-Purpose Cooperative and the One-Town-One-Product of Bugallon, Pangasinan, the Best Beverage Award (wine category) of the 7th Agraryo Trade Fair of June 4–8, 2008, Megatrade Hall 2, 5th Level Building B, SM Megamall, Mandaluyong
Rice, mango, antique home furnishings, vinegar, sawali products.
Shrine of the Our Lady of Lourdes/Salasa Church (1720), Busay Waterfalls, Mt. Zion Pilgrim’s Site, Biak-na-Bato Falls, Gen. Torres Bugallon Park.
Carabao Festival -January 13, 2012 - 24 carabaos; "palengkera ang kalabaw" wasBarangay Cabayaoasan.
The cascading waters of brooks and streams located in Barangays Cayanga, Portic, Hacienda,  Laguit Padilla, Laguit Centro, San Francisco,  Salomague Sur, Salomague Norte, Umanday and Gueset coming from the fresh water sources in the Zambales mountain slopes.
SOFIA'S Mountain Home Resort, Barangay Portic (owned by ex-Judge and ex-Vice Mayor Eliseo Versoza.
San Jose Hillside Farm, Barangay Laguit Padilla (owned by Atty. Agerico V. Guiang & Mrs. Nieves V. Guiang).
Swimming pool, Sampaguita (formerly Primicias Farm, Barangay Portic).
Nipa swamps, vinegar, and wine making industry from "tuba" (Barangays Salasa, Bañaga, Pantal, Asinan and Magtaking)
Dam structures (NIA, Barangays Cayanga and Portic)
Pangasinan State University Tissue Culture Project ( Congressman Amado Espino, Jr. farm, Barangay Portic.
Monastery of the contemplative Hermits of the Living Word or Hermit sisters, Barangay Portic
Agno River Flood Control River, Barangays Salasa and Bañaga, zigzagging bridge (Philippine-Japanese financed project)
Vinegar industry of Barangays Asinan, Magtaking and Bañaga, Sawali making in Barangays Magtaking, Gueset and Laguit Padilla, Mango puree production, Candle making Factory, Barangay Pangascasan (Catro's) and in Poblacion (Tuliao's Candle Making Cottage Industry).
Salasa Parish Church

St. Andrew the Apostle Parish Church

The 1920 St. Andrew the Apostle Parish Church (Poblacion, Bugallon, 2416 Pangasinan)  is under the jurisdiction of the Roman Catholic Archdiocese of Lingayen-Dagupan, Roman Catholic Diocese of Alaminos. The church has impressive inspired-baroque type of altar for the saints.

Its Feast Day is November 30 with Parish Priest, Fr. Dominador Mendoza, Jr., Population of 57,445. It is part of the Vicariate of Our Lady of Lourdes, under Vicar Forane, Father Raymond R. Oligane

St. Andrew the Apostle Parish was originally erected at Salasa (founded by the Dominicans in the 18th century). When the town site was transferred, the seat of the parish was also transferred as a consequence brought about by natural calamities that battered the area.

The 1914 Salasa floods destroyed crops, properties, buildings, the church and convent. Poblacion was transferred to Barangay Anagao (Bugallon), under Our Lady of Lourdes and St. Andrew the Apostle remained the patron Saint in July 1920 with 1st Parish Priest, Fr. Eustaquio Ocampo, then,  Fr. Montano Domingo on November 29, 1921, and in June 1928, Fr Emeterio Domagas succeeded.

On May 23, 1929, Pangasinan was created as a new Diocese and Msgr. Cesar Maria Guerrero became Pangasinan's First Bishop on May 23, 1929. In 1930, Franciscan Capuchin appointed Fr. Cesario of Legario and Fr. Fernando of Erasum to Bugallon and Salasa, respectively on September 17, 1930. The Salasa Church, one of the biggest in Philippines, 100 meters long was completely destroyed and despoiled by Bugallon natives. Fr. Benjamin of Ilarduya became Kura Paroko from October 16, 1933, to June 27, 1941. The church brick-structure and the old façade were built. During World War II,  Fr. Hipolito of Azcoita parish priest of Labrador, was transferred to Bugallon. Father Fidel Lekamania added the convent, while Father Pedro V. Sison finished the rehabilitationof the Church.

St. Joseph is the Principal Patron of the Diocese of Alaminos, Suffragan of Lingayen-Dagupan, Created and Erected: January 12, 1985, under Bishop Marlo M. Peralta, D.D. 2404 Alaminos, Pangasinan and Bishop-Emeritus Jesus A.Cabrera, D.D.

Incidents

Bugallon Mayor Rodrigo Orduña and Barangay Chairman Fernando Alimagno filed on December 14, 2012, at the Ombudsman of the Philippines plunder case against Pangasinan Governor Amado Espino, Jr. Orduña alleged that he was Espino’s jueteng collector since 2001, and that Espino earned P900 million from gambling operators.

Pangasinan police director and chief, Senior Supt. Mariano Luis Verzosa had been removed and transferred to the main PNP headquarters in Camp Crame, Quezon City, allegedly due to conflict of interest since his daughter, Lingayen City Councilor Maan Versoza, is running for 2013 reelection. But the Nationalist People’s Coalition supported Espino.

Gallery

See also
List of renamed cities and municipalities in the Philippines

References

External links

 Bugallon Profile at PhilAtlas.com
 Bugallon Pangasinan Website
  Municipal Profile at the National Competitiveness Council of the Philippines
 Bugallon at the Pangasinan Government Website
 Bugallon Pangasinan website
 Taga-Bugallon Facebook Group
 Bugallon Website
 Local Governance Performance Management System
 [ Philippine Standard Geographic Code]
 Philippine Census Information

Municipalities of Pangasinan
Populated places on the Agno River